is a Japanese free announcer. She is a former TBS announcer from 2008 until 2015.

Current appearances

Television

Radio

Serialisations

Former appearances

Tarento era

 Narration

 Advertisements

Registered to TBS

Television
 Regular

 Spot appearances

As a free announcer

TV dramas

Other stations

Radio

See also
List of Tokyo Broadcasting System announcers

References

External links
  - 
  – Wayback Machine (archived on 10 April 2015) - 
  – Wayback Machine (archived on 30 June 2015) - 
  - 

Japanese sports announcers
Former Stardust Promotion artists
Seijo University alumni
People from Yokohama
1985 births
Living people